"Burning Ground" is a song written by Northern Irish singer-songwriter Van Morrison and included on his 1997 album, The Healing Game.  For this song, Morrison got his inspiration from a common scene from his childhood when jute was shipped to Belfast from India in the 1950s.

Clinton Heylin calls the song "a potentially important song about a man still caught half-way between heaven and hell."

Personnel on original release
Van Morrison – vocals, harmonica
Ronnie Johnson – electric guitar
Alec Dankworth – double bass
Leo Green – tenor saxophone
Geoff Dunn – drums
Pee Wee Ellis – baritone saxophone, backing vocals
Robin Aspland – piano
Brian Kennedy – backing vocals
Katie Kissoon – backing vocals
Horns arranged by – Pee Wee Ellis and Leo Green

Notes

References
Heylin, Clinton (2003). Can You Feel the Silence? Van Morrison: A New Biography, Chicago Review Press, 
Hinton, Brian (1997). Celtic Crossroads: The Art of Van Morrison, Sanctuary, 

1997 songs
Van Morrison songs
Songs written by Van Morrison
Song recordings produced by Van Morrison